Olga Borisovna Graf (born 15 July 1983) is a Russian speed skater. Graf competed at the 2014 Winter Olympics, where she won bronze medals both in the 3000 metres event and in the team pursuit.

Personal life
Olga Graf was born 15 July 1983 in Omsk, Soviet Union.  She began speed skating in 1995 when her martial arts instructor suggested that she try it. She attended the Siberian State University of Physical Education and Sport.  In 2007, she joined the Russian national speed skating team.

Graf is married to Rustam Madaminov and lives in Kolomna, Russia. She speaks Russian, German and English.

Early speed skating career
Graf gradually worked her way up the world standings in women's speed skating.  In her debut 2007–08 World Cup appearance she finished 56th in the 3000m/5000m.  In the 2009–10 World Cup she improved her 3000m/5000m result slightly to 46th. She performed better that year in the 1500m where she finished 35th.   She did not qualify for the 2010 Winter Olympics in Vancouver.

It was not until the 2011–12 World Cup that Graf was able to crack the top ten in the individual. That year she finished 9th in the 3000m/5000m.   In the 2012–13 World Cup she placed 7th in the 3000m/5000m and 3rd in the 5000m event.

2014 Sochi Olympics
At the 2014 Winter Olympics in the 3000m event Graf skated in the 10th pair against Jilleanne Rookard of the United States.  She finished with a time of 4:03.47 which was good enough for first place.  However, two pairs later Martina Sáblíková of the Czech Republic finished with a time of 4:01.95, pushing Graf into second.  In the thirteenth and final pair Ireen Wüst of the Netherlands finished with a time 4:00.34 and win the gold medal and moving Graf into third for bronze.

Graf finished 4th in the 5000 metres event, missing out on a podium position by 0.11 of a second.  In the team pursuit, Graf helped her team win the bronze medal behind Netherlands and Poland.

2018 Pyeongchang Olympics
Graf qualified for the 2018 Winter Olympics and was invited to participate by the International Olympic Committee. She, however, said that she is not going to participate. She said that her main target was the team pursuit, and out of four Russian female skaters who qualified IOC only invited two (including Graf) to participate, so that the Olympic Athletes from Russia were not able to form a pursuit team. She was not planning to retire in 2017/18 season.

Personal records

References

1983 births
Russian female speed skaters
Speed skaters at the 2014 Winter Olympics
Olympic speed skaters of Russia
Medalists at the 2014 Winter Olympics
Olympic medalists in speed skating
Olympic bronze medalists for Russia
Sportspeople from Omsk
Russian people of German descent
Living people
World Allround Speed Skating Championships medalists
World Single Distances Speed Skating Championships medalists